Congénies is a commune in the Gard department in southern France.

It is situated between Nîmes, Montpellier, the Cévennes and the Camargue and has a strong Quaker  history. Congénies possesses the only and oldest purpose-built Quaker Meeting House in France.

History

Wars of Religion
Le Desert.
From 1661 onwards, the Catholic King Louis XIV used various incitations to re-convert French Protestants to Catholicism. In 1681 he started using troops to force these conversions. In 1685, the Edict of Fontainebleau outlawed Protestantism everywhere in the Kingdom of France. A lot of pastors had already either converted or emigrated and the king was under the false impression that there remained almost no Protestants in France. In fact among the plain people, chiefly farmers, farm workers and small crafters, a lot had stayed in France, complying in a minimal way with the king's demands. In 1685, the religion moved completely underground and visits by clandestine pastors became the only and very rare way to relate to the Reformed faith. In times of exasperation due to the intensity of repression, "inspired" lay prophets, claiming they took their instructions directly from God,  stood up and took the lead of the "small (protestant) flock".

La Guerre des Camisards (1702–1711)

From July 1702, some of the prophets led peasants into an armed revolt which spread mainly in the Cévennes mountains. Le low country, where Congénies is located, was much less affected although on 17 December 1703, Jean Cavalier, a Camisard leader came down into the low country and torched the Catholic church. The people of Congénies and the surrounding region, the Vaunage, are believed to have remained faithful to the general non-violent line which prevailed in other French Protestant regions. Congénies was affected a second time between 19 and 27 May 1704 when peace negotiations were organised between the Royal troops commander Marshall de Villars and Jean Cavalier in the neighbouring village of Calvisson. During these eight days there was a general truce in which allowed the Cévennes' prophets to interact freely with the population. Numerous public Protestant worships were organised at this occasion. The local religious tradition was thus principled and relied on an inner spirit, the Inspiration. This history set the stage for the ensuing religious developments in Congénies, among which the development of a local quaker community, wholly unrelated to any other quaker group, and the blossoming of a Methodist mission under the leadership of the English pastor Charles Cook.

Quaker connection
In 1715, Jean Bénezet of Calvisson was exiled to Holland, and then to London. His son, Antoine, made it to Philadelphia. Both joined the Society of Friends.

Paul Codognan, born in Congénies, walked to London in 1768 and returned on foot to Congénies with Quaker literature. In 1785, the Inspiré made formal contact with the Society of Friends in London.

The Meeting house and cemetery was built on land purchased from Georges Majolier in 1822. It remained in the ownership of the Societes des Amis, until 1907, when the group was too small to maintain it. This was caused by young men emigrating as they could not accept military service, and the young women marrying out of the Society. The Meeting House served as a hospital in the First World War, and was owned in recent years by two English Quaker families and was sold back to the French Friends in 2003. The building has been gutted and is being rebuilt with the interior in the modern style. The exterior is being maintained, and the future of the cemetery is safe.

The name Congénies appears in many Quaker biographies (e.g., that of John Yeardley,) giving evidence of frequent visits. Congénies possessed also a méthodist chapelle between 1869 and 1968.

Population

Pronunciation and spelling
The name Congénies stems from the Latin Congeniæ and is spelt Coungènio in local Occitan language - knowing that the final "o" is mute in Occitan. Therefore, in spite of the ornemental final "s" which was added, the right pronunciation is "congéni" and the pronunciation with an accent on the final "e" (congéniès) is a sure marker of a non-native. Only the resemblance with names which do have a final "ès" instead of the rarer "es" (e.g. Saint-Geniès-des-Mourgues) can explain this confusion, which, strangely, became official when a ministerial decree of 12 July 1878 dealing with the construction of the train station reproduced the mistake in print. The mistake then appeared on the train station itself and on many documents, postcards, etc. since then. Only in the early 1960s was the correct spelling reestablished... which didn't prevent the "accent of division" to reappear when new road signs were put in place in 1994, nor did it prevent the inhabitants of the wider region to continue to pronounce congéniès. Alain Pierrugues et Édouard Ravon are for instance propagating this error in a recent book, adding the theory that it is a sign that original Languedoc French has been replaced by a more standardised Northern French. Local usage of the "congéni" pronunciation remained however unchanged

Sights
The gothic catholic church ( XIIème-XVIIème ) with the " Nogaret bell"  The Protestant temple was built between 1817 and 1818, the menhir of Peyra Plantada ( 2500 BC ) is considerably older and there are many capitelles in the garrigues.

Personalities
Christine Majolier- b. 1805 Congénies, Joined Society of Friends in 1828, died 19 June 1879. Tireless Quaker activist, she often acted as interpreter to other well known Quakers visiting France. As a friend of Mme Rollande, governess to Queen Victoria's children, Christine was often visited by them and invited to meet the Queen. Naturally they spoke French, and in the Quaker manner, Christine wore simple dress addressed her using the tu form, to which the queen took no offence.
Robert Charleton, visited in the 1821/2 when a child.
Elizabeth Fry, the prison reformer, visited in 1839 while on a campaigning visit to Nîmes. She celebrated her 60th birthday in the village.
Henry Newman, a fine watercolourist and from a Quaker family in Leominster, visited Congénies in 1864, and produced an album of watercolours which remain in private hands.

Present
Congénies celebrates its Languedoc heritage with the traditional bull running. Over three days each year there are Abrivados and Bandidos, and bandido de nuit, this occurs over the weekend of 14 July.

See also
Communes of the Gard department

References

External links

Van Etten Book: Congénies et sa vie quaker
Congénies quaker's house 
 Association for history of Congénies 

Communes of Gard
Friends meeting houses